Gavray-sur-Sienne is a commune in the Manche department in north-western France. It was established on 1 January 2019 by merger of the former communes of Gavray (the seat), Le Mesnil-Amand, Le Mesnil-Rogues and Sourdeval-les-Bois.

See also
Communes of the Manche department

References

Communes of Manche